2003–04 Belarusian Cup was the thirteenth season of the Belarusian annual football cup competition. Contrary to the league season, it is conducted in a fall-spring rhythm. The first games were played on 4 June 2003. Winners of the Cup qualified for the UEFA Cup first qualifying round.

First round
In this round 8 clubs from Second League were drawn against 8 clubs from First League. Another four First League teams (Torpedo-Kadino Mogilev, Lokomotiv Vitebsk, Pinsk-900 and MTZ-RIPO Minsk) advanced to the next round by drawing of lots. The rest of First and Second League teams (four from each) chose not to participate in this edition of the Cup for financial reasons.

Round of 32
12 winners of previous round were joined by 16 clubs from Premier League. 4 of 16 Premier League clubs (Dnepr-Transmash Mogilev, Darida Minsk Raion, Lokomotiv Minsk, Gomel) advanced to the next round by drawing of lots. The games were played on 9 and 10 August 2003.

Round of 16
The games were played on 8 October 2003.

Quarterfinals
The games were played on 3 April 2004.

Semifinals
The first legs were played on 7 April 2004. The second legs were played on 11 April 2004.

|}

First leg

Second leg

Final

External links
RSSSF

Belarusian Cup seasons
Belarusian Cup
Cup
Cup